Gennadas elegans is a species of shrimps in the family Benthesicymidae. It is found on the east coast of the United States.

References

External links 

 Gennadas elegans at WoRMS

Dendrobranchiata
Crustaceans described in 1882